The Yarroweyah Football Netball Club, nicknamed the Hoppers, is an Australian rules football and netball club playing in the Picola & District Football League. The club is based in the small town of Yarroweyah, Victoria.

A Yarroweyah Football Club competed in the Murray Border Football Association between 1893 and 1901, and football was certainly being played in the town prior to that, but the current club of that name was not born until 1955, commencing in the Picola & District Football League - the competition it still calls home to this day.

In recent years, the club has struggled to find the numbers to be able to field teams. In 2016, the seniors team finished in last position, winning only one match for the year.

Premierships

References

External links
 

Picola & District Football League clubs
Australian rules football clubs in Victoria (Australia)
1955 establishments in Australia
Australian rules football clubs established in 1955